Mitcham Cricket Club is reported by The Independent to be the oldest cricket club in existence, with the club having played cricket on Mitcham Cricket Green since 1685. The club was reportedly watched by Lord Nelson during his time in the area.

Four players from the club have played for the England cricket team, fast bowler Tom Richardson; batsman Andy Sandham; and wicketkeeper Herbert Strudwick, and opening batsman David Smith, who played for Mitcham CC at Colts level. The ladies team was the local club for Molly Hide, who captained England for 17 years and later became president of the Women's Cricket Association.

References

External links
Official site

Former senior cricket clubs
English cricket teams in the 18th century
English club cricket teams
Sport in the London Borough of Merton